The Abaskuul, Abasguul, Abasgul or Abaskul (Somali: Abasguul, Abaskuul. Arabic: ابسغول) is a Somali sub-clan of the Jidwaaq, Absame, Kumade, Kablalah, Darod line. The Abaskuul mainly reside between Jigjiga and Degahbur in the Somali Region in Ethiopia, but also have settlements in Jubaland (Somalia) and Kenya. They share borders with the Ogaden, Bartire, and Habar Awal clans. The Abaskuul were famously described in Richard Burton's First Footsteps in East Africa, as well as 17 Trips to Somaliland and a Visit to Abyssinia by Captain Harald G. C. Swayne.

Distribution 
The Abaskuul clan makes up a significant portion of the Fafan and Middle-Juba valleys in Ethiopia's Somali Region and Somalia, respectively. Fafan is also generally regarded as the most densely populated region in the Somali Region, given that a large majority of the inhabitants are agro-pastoralists. In addition to Jigjiga, the Abaskuul make the majority of inhabitants of the neighboring districts such as Mulla, Kebribeyah, and Araarso. In Somalia, the clan is mostly centered around Bu'aale and Naasiriya districts in Middle Juba, along with Bartire, whom they make up Jidwaaq together.

There are also pockets of long-term Abaskuul settlements in Somaliland, particularly the Isse-subclan, in parts of Sool. They lack representation in Somaliland. Skirmishes between the Abaskuul and the Fiqishinni in Adhicadeeye ended with government settlement.

The Abaskuul clan have many branches or subclans that include: 

Abdirahman Osman (Reer Guled Jamac & Reer Ibrahim)
Yahye Osman “ Garuure”
Hassan Osman 
Cusubo Osman
Abdalle Osman
Mohamed Osman
Dawaro Osman
Botor Osman
Bare Osman
Isse Yussuf
Ismail Yussuf
Ragsay Yussuf
Muse Yussuf
Omar Jibrail
Reer Yaasuf
Wacays-Moge
Ibrahim Nuux

Notable figures 
The Abaskuul clan have produced many notable figures, including:
 Hawo Osman (Taako), Somali Republic martyr and struggle figure

 Dr Sh Abdikhabiir Mohamed “Faysal”is an Islamic scholar and teacher of Al Bayan University, and Umul Quraan “ Hargeisa
 Abdifatah Abdullahi Hassan, Former Federal Minister of Labor & Social Affairs and current Ambassador of Ethiopia to Somalia.
 Abdikarim Qalinle, The Chief Judge of Waqooyi-Galbeed district, prior to the collapse of the Somali Republic. 
 Abdiwasa Bade, Current Minister of Science and Technology in Ethiopia 
 Abdullahi Bade, Founding member of the SYL.
 Abdullahi Yussuf Weerar (Abdullahi Ethiopia), former Vice President & Security Minister of Somali State-Region.
 Ayan Abdi Wamo, current Speaker of the Somali State-Region Parliament.
 Camanje Yogol, a famous poet during the pre- and post-colonial periods
 Mohamed Osman Jama (James), current Deputy Minister of Humanitarian & Disaster Management of Jubbaland State of Somalia.
 Mubashir Dubbad Raage, Former Minister of Finance, current Minister of Security of the Somali State-Region. 
 Sulub Ahmed Firin, current Deputy-Minister of Transportation & Aviation of Federal Republic of Somalia.
 Ugaas Abdullahi Ahmed Shide, a clan elder and respected peacemaker across Jubbaland State.
.

References

Somali clans
Darod